Sufotidine (INN, USAN, codenamed AH25352) is a long-acting competitive H2 receptor antagonist which was under development as an antiulcerant by Glaxo (now GlaxoSmithKline). It was planned to be a follow-up compound to ranitidine (Zantac). When taken in doses of 600 mg twice daily it induced virtually 24-hour gastric anacidity thus closely resembling the antisecretory effect of the proton pump inhibitor omeprazole. Its development was terminated in 1989 from phase III clinical trials based on the appearance of carcinoid tumors in long-term toxicity testing in rodents.

Synthesis

See also 
 Lavoltidine (previously known as loxtidine) — a similar compound in which methylsulfone group is replaced with hydroxyl

References 

Abandoned drugs
Amines
H2 receptor antagonists
1-Piperidinyl compounds
Triazoles
Phenol ethers
Sulfones